Wyoming Highway 233 (WYO 233) is a  state highway in south-central Lincoln County, Wyoming that serves the town of Frontier and outlying areas to the northwest, including the Viva Naughton Reservoir. In addition WYO 233 provides access to the Kemmerer Municipal Airport.

Route description
Wyoming Highway 233 begins its southern end at U.S. Route 189 at the northern city limits of Kemmerer. WYO 233 passes the Island Golf Club as it turns north from US 189. Almost immediately after, WYO 233 leaves Kemmerer and enters the small unincorporated community of Frontier. Past the airport spur, Highway 233 travels in a more northwesterly direction toward the Viva Naughton Reservoir which it reaches at just over 14 miles. CR 305 continues beyond Lake Viva Haughton and leads to the Commissary Ridge of the Bridger-Teton National Forest.

Major intersections

References

External links

Wyoming Routes 200-299
WYO 233 - US 189 to Lincoln CR 305
Kremmerer Municipal Airport

Transportation in Lincoln County, Wyoming
233